Abraham Mordechai Piurko (15 February 1853 – 11 June 1933) was a Hebrew-language author, children's writer, publisher, and educator.

Biography

Piurko was born to a Jewish family in Lomza, Poland. After having studied Talmud and rabbinics, he devoted himself to modern Hebrew literature, publishing successively: Bat Yiftaḥ (Lyck, 1873), a Biblical poem; Reʿuyim ha-devarim le-mi she-omrim (Warsaw, 1880), criticisms on Biblical and Talmudical legends; Sefer mikhtavim ha-shalem (Warsaw, 1882), a Hebrew letter-writer, containing 150 specimens of letters on different subjects; Nitʻe naʻamanim (Warsaw, 1884), 100 stories for the young; Kur ha-mivḥan (Warsaw, 1887), a book for teachers, containing a Biblical catechism; and Haskalah medumah (Warsaw, 1888), a sketch of Jewish life.

In 1893 Piurko published eleven stories for children, two of which were written by his son Ḥayyim, and in 1894 Shevet sofer ha-shalem, a new letter-writer, also containing 150 specimens. In the same year he published Yilkut ha-reʻim, a grammatical work in verse, and issued a new and revised edition of his Nitʻe naʻamanim. Elef ha-magen, a grammar for school courses, was published in 1898.

In 1899 Piurko began the publication of the weekly periodical Gan sha'ashu'im, the first Hebrew children's newspaper outside Palestine. Besides numerous articles by him, two of his works deserving special mention were published in the newspaper, namely, Av le-banim (1899) and Ha-rav ve-talmidav (1900). The latter work consists of essays on grammar. In addition, Piurko contributed to many Hebrew and Yiddish periodicals in Odessa, Saint Petersburg, and Warsaw.

Publications

References
 

1853 births
1933 deaths
Grammarians of Hebrew
Hebrew-language writers
People from Grajewo County
People from Łomża
Polish children's writers
Polish Hebraists
Polish publishers (people)
Writers of young adult literature